Shahiduzzaman Sarker is a Bangladesh Awami League politician and the incumbent Member of Parliament. He is served as the Whip of Treasury Bench of the Parliament of Bangladesh. On 1 May 2020, he became the first member of the Bangladesh Parliament to test positive for COVID-19.

Early life
Sarkar was born on 13 December 1955.

Career
Sarker was elected to Parliament from Naogaon-2 in 1991 as a candidate of Bangladesh Awami League. He was elected to Parliament again in 2008 from Naogaon-2. He was elected unopposed in 2014 after the main opposition, Bangladesh Nationalist Party, boycotted the election. He was made a Parliamentary whip on 25 January 2014.

References

Awami League politicians
Living people
11th Jatiya Sangsad members
9th Jatiya Sangsad members
10th Jatiya Sangsad members
5th Jatiya Sangsad members
Year of birth missing (living people)
People from Dhamoirhat Upazila
21st-century Bengalis
20th-century Bengalis